David Howard Travis (born 9 September 1945) was a major figure in UK javelin throwing during the 1960s and 1970s.  He competed at the 1968 and 1972 summer Olympics in the javelin and won a gold medal in the 1967 World Student Games and the 1970 Commonwealth Games. He was an international athlete from 1965 to 1978 and the British record holder for 4 years.

Early life and school sport

He was born in Strawberry Hill, south west London, in 1945 and lived for the first eleven years in East Twickenham, subsequently moving to Hinchley Wood near Esher. He attended Hampton Grammar School from 1957 to 1964 where his talent for sport was nurtured. He excelled at school athletics in a variety of events, making his debut at the English Schools Championships in 1960, placing second in the under 15 shot.  Two titles in the javelin were achieved in 1963 and 1964, whilst also figuring in the winning sprint relay team for Middlesex Schools in 1962. His club career for Surrey Athletic Club included a British under 19 record of 70.70m in 1964. He left secondary school with national status in three disciplines: javelin, decathlon and rugby.

Education and career

He went on to study at Loughborough College from 1965 to 1968, gaining a Teaching Qualification and a First Class Diploma.  From 1968 to 1990 he forged a career as a PE teacher and Pastoral Head, before going on to a sport development career which culminated in becoming Director of Sport in Education for Bristol City Council.  In 1999 this work was recognised with a national Sportsmatch Award.

Sport (javelin/decathlon)

Following a successful schools athletic career, he made his senior international debut in the javelin in 1965 and was selected for the Empire Games in Jamaica in 1966.  A year later in 1967 he won the World Student Games title in Tokyo and made the Olympic team in 1968 in Mexico City.  He was coached at the time by Colin Smith, hitherto Britain’s most successful javelin thrower at international level.  The main event in 1969 was the European Championships in Athens. Although placing only 9th, the best result yet for Britain in this event, it could have been much better with a throw ruled flat by the judges which would have won a bronze medal.

1970 was to prove his best year, setting a UK record of 82.22m in July, winning the Commonwealth Games title by almost 3 metres, and scoring a significant victory in the European Cup beating Janis Lusis, the Olympic champion and world record holder from Russia, with a British Record throw of 83.44 m.  He maintained his domestic dominance through the early 70s  -  winning 7 AAA javelin titles from 1965 to 1974  -  and gained a silver medal at the 1974 Commonwealth Games in New Zealand.  Although regularly exceeding 80 metres in competition, his personal best remained the same despite qualifying 2nd in the European Championships in Rome with a throw of 82.38 m. He proved to be one of the most consistent UK javelin throwers recording 21 throws over 80m between 1969 and 1974.

His decathlon career started in 1964 with a British junior record, and in 1965 he made his international senior debut setting a short lived UK record mark.  In 1968 he attempted to qualify for both the javelin and decathlon for the Olympic Games in Mexico City but fell just short with a new personal best of 7,067 points.  At the end of that season he left the decathlon behind to concentrate on the javelin.

Sport (rugby union/weightlifting)

He combined rugby with athletics at school and reached the top representative level.  In 1963/4  he was selected for English Schools in matches against Wales (twice) and France as a wing three quarter, and in the selection trials he was selected ahead of David Duckham, who later went on to be a major figure in the English senior team.  He represented Loughborough Colleges in 1965 playing outside the legendary Welsh player Gerald Davis but he halted his career that year to concentrate on athletics.  A brief return to the game for the 1970/71 season for Richmond proved to be his last first class appearance, although later in life he represented Barker Butts RFC in the Warwickshire Cup Final at the age of 38.

Alongside his athletics training, he developed an expertise in Olympic Weightlifting for the Twickenham and Sunbury clubs. This resulted in Middlesex and South East England titles with personal bests of 105 kg for the snatch and 135 kg for the clean and jerk.

Sport (coaching)

As his throwing days came to an end, he became involved in coaching with a group of throwers in Birmingham including Dave Ottley and John Trower, which led to a brief spell as National Event Coach.  His guidance helped Dave Ottley to a silver medal at the 1984 Olympic Games and launched John Trower as a high level coach who would go on to assist Steve Backley and Mick Hill to international titles.

References

 Javelin: A Statistical Survey of British Throwing, Ian Tempest 1999. National Union of Track Statisticians
 UK All Time Rankings www.gbrathletics.com
 Athletics Weekly: July 1975, July 2014.
 www.surreyathletics.org.uk/trackfield/database/profile

External links
 
 
 

1945 births
Living people
Athletes (track and field) at the 1966 British Empire and Commonwealth Games
Athletes (track and field) at the 1968 Summer Olympics
Athletes (track and field) at the 1970 British Commonwealth Games
Athletes (track and field) at the 1972 Summer Olympics
Athletes (track and field) at the 1974 British Commonwealth Games
Commonwealth Games gold medallists for England
Commonwealth Games medallists in athletics
English male javelin throwers
Olympic athletes of Great Britain
Athletes from London
Sportspeople from Twickenham
Universiade gold medalists for Great Britain
Universiade medalists in athletics (track and field)
Medalists at the 1967 Summer Universiade
Medallists at the 1970 British Commonwealth Games
Medallists at the 1974 British Commonwealth Games